Petros Solomon (born 1951; also known as Wed'Solomon, Son of Solomon) is an Eritrean politician. He was an Eritrean People's Liberation Front commander during the Eritrean War of Independence, and following independence he served in several positions in the Cabinet, including Minister of Defense and Minister of Foreign Affairs. He has been in prison, held incommunicado in an undisclosed location, since September 18, 2001 for opposing the rule of Eritrean president Isaias Afewerki. Amnesty International has named him a prisoner of conscience.

His wife Aster Yohannes, who was also a freedom fighter and member of EPLF, was detained by security personnel at Asmara International Airport in the capital Asmara on December 11, 2003, when she returned after a three-year period of study at the University of Phoenix to unite with her children. She is imprisoned at Carshel in Asmara Eritrea. All four of Solomon's children live in exile.

Early life
Solomon was born in a recognized family in Asmara. He completed his early education in Asmara and Addis Ababa. He was attending the Haile Selassie University in 1972, when he joined EPLF. He is married to Aster Yohannes, who joined the front in 1972. The pair have four children, Simon, the twins Zerai and Hanna, and Meaza. The pair fought in the independence struggle with Ethiopia, in which the EPLF gained de facto independence for Eritrea in 1991

During the Eritrean War of Independence

Petros Solomon was a member of the Eritrean People's Liberation Front (EPLF). From 1972 until the end of the Eritrean War of Independence in 1991, he served as Chief Strategist and the head of Military Intelligence (Brigade 72) of the EPLF. He also served as a member of the executive committee (Politburo) of EPLF from 1977 to 1994. During the War of Independence, he is credited with having single-handedly organized the EPLF's intelligence section. He is also credited with having been the commander of the Nakfa, Kerkebet and Zara fronts during the war in the early 1980s. He led the battle of Massawa in 1977; He also, along with Ogbe Abraha, led the battle to liberate the town of Barentu in 1987.

After Eritrean Independence

In 1991, as he commanded the EPLF army that besieged Asmara, taking charge of the city when it fell to his forces. In its June 16, 1991 publication, The New York Times stated that after the fall of Asmara, "Petros Solomon, was running the city until the arrival of Isaias Afewerki". Following independence, Petros Solomon served in various cabinet positions. He served as the first Minister of Defense of Eritrea. In mid-February 1997, he was moved from the post of Minister of Foreign Affairs to that of Minister of Marine Resources.

During his time as a Minister of Marine Resources, "he independently conceived of a biosaline agriculture as a way of building the economy of the country and gave enthusiastic support to Manzanar Project".

In September 2001 he was detained indefinitely along with other politicians who were known as the G-15, a group which opposes the rule of Eritrean president Isaias Afewerki. Solomon along with 15 other ministers were arrested by the ruling front and detained in unknown location ever since. The ministers were criticizing the border war of the then president, Isaia and signed an open letter. He was fired along with other opposing members and was detained on 18 September 2001. He was considered a prisoner of conscience by Amnesty International.

Reaction to the arrest

Dan Connell made an observation that, "It was inevitable he would clash with Isaias Afewerki". After Petros's detention many of his former subordinates who publicly opposed his arrest were themselves arrested as a result, including Kidane Wedi Qeshi who used to be Communications Operator for Petros Solomon, Mehari (last name unknown) who was Chauffeur for Petros Solomon, Tesfai "Gomorra" Gebreab who was a close friend of Petros Solomon. Tsedal Yohannes, the sister of Petros Solomon's wife, has been fighting against the Eritrean government about the status of her sister and her husband ever since from London.

References

External links
Awate.com
Friends of Aster
Amnesty International report

1951 births
Amnesty International prisoners of conscience held by Eritrea
Eritrean People's Liberation Front members
Eritrean prisoners and detainees
Foreign ministers of Eritrea
Defense ministers of Eritrea
Living people
People from Asmara
Eritrean soldiers
Eritrean spies
People's Front for Democracy and Justice politicians